Boffles is a commune in the Pas-de-Calais department in the Hauts-de-France region in northern France.

Geography
Boffles is a small village located 25 miles (41 km) west of Arras on the D116 road.
The market town of Auxi-le-Château lies 4 miles to the west and Frevent, 6 miles to the east. Auxi-le-Château has a weekly market, banks, supermarkets and a selection of shops. There are also several restaurants and bars serving local French cuisine.

The village is situated near a number of sights of the Pas-de-Calais and the Somme region, including a number of museums and battlefield sites relating to both first and second world wars.

The Picardy region and Paris are also accessible from the village.

Boffles has its own Maire, Raymond Croisel, Mairie at 21 Rue Marronniers and a church and records date to 1763.

As well as French residents, there are a number of English, Dutch and Brazilian people who live in the village.

The graves of four British soldiers killed during wartime can be seen in the churchyard.

There are a number of community and social gatherings throughout the year.

Population
In 2013, the population of Boffles grew to 54 residents following the construction of several new houses. The geographical location, peacefulness and community spirit makes the village a much sought after place to live to escape the more populated towns in the area.

The inhabitants of Boffles are known as Bofflois.

Sights
 The church of St. Martin, dating from the nineteenth century.
 The Commonwealth War Graves Commission graves.
 An English speaking Gite Complex Le Petit Hameau
 Walks, countryside views and cycling opportunities.

See also
Communes of the Pas-de-Calais department

References

External links

 The CWGC graves.

Communes of Pas-de-Calais